Scilla nana, known as dwarf glory-of-the-snow, is a bulbous perennial from Crete flowering in early spring with flowers in shades of lilac blue. After flowering, it goes into dormancy until the next spring. It belongs to a group of Scilla species that were formerly put in a separate genus, Chionodoxa, and may now be treated as Scilla sect. Chionodoxa. It has not always been recognized as distinct from Scilla cretica.

Description
Like all members of Scilla sect. Chionodoxa, the bases of the stamens of Scilla nana are flattened and closely clustered in the middle of the flower. In other species of Scilla, the stamens are not flattened or clustered together.

S. nana (like S. cretica) has two leaves per bulb, and at most one flowering stem, with one to five (more commonly three) flowers in a loose raceme. Individual flowers are up to 2.4 cm diameter with tepals up to 1.1 cm long, most facing upwards, the overall colour effect being some shade of lilac-blue. Sfikas distinguishes between smaller plants with whitish flowers occurring above 1700 m, S. nana, and larger plants with bluer flowers occurring below 1700 m, S. cretica.

S. nana subsp. albescens (synonym S. albescens) is recognized by some sources, although not by others. It has slightly smaller flowers (tepals up to 1 cm long), whitish with lavender to violet-blue tips. It was awarded the RHS Award of Garden Merit (H4 – hardy outdoors anywhere in the British Isles) in 2004, subject to availability.

Taxonomy
Scilla nana was first described in 1829, as Hyacinthus nana, by Josef August Schultes and Julius Hermann Schultes. It was transferred to Chionodoxa in 1854. Chionodoxa was separated from Scilla partly on the basis of the flattened stamen bases. Phylogenetic studies showed that Chionodoxa was nested within Scilla. Former Chionodoxa species may now be treated as Scilla sect. Chionodoxa.

Plants occurring in Crete have at one time or another been put into one of three species (in either Scilla or Chionodoxa): S. albescens , S. cretica  and S. nana . Sfikas' Wild flowers of Crete recognized only two of these (in Chionodoxa as C. cretica and C. nana); the Natural History Museum's checklist of the Cretan Flora recognized only one (S. nana). , the World Checklist of Selected Plant Families accepts both S. nana and S. cretica.

Distribution and habitat
Scilla nana is endemic to Crete, where it occurs at elevations of 1700–2300 m.

Notes and references

Bibliography
 
 * 
 
 
 

nana
Ephemeral plants
Plants described in 1829
Flora of Crete